Joel Sacks (born 10 April 1989) is an Argentine football defender who currently plays for Libertad of the Torneo Federal A.

Honours
Atlético de Rafaela
Primera B Nacional: 2010–11

References

External links
 
 
 Goal.com Profile
 Futbolparatodos.com.ar Profile
 

1989 births
Living people
Argentine footballers
Association football midfielders
Argentine Primera División players
Atlético de Rafaela footballers
People from Rafaela
Sportspeople from Santa Fe Province